Antti Lieroinen (died 1643), was a famous Finnish cunning man, who was executed of witchcraft.  He belongs to the more well known of the victims of the witch trials in Finland, were male folk magicians were among the most common victims. 

Lieroinen was famous in contemporary Finland as a professional wizard (cunning man) long before his trial, particularly for his alleged ability to find stolen objects,   but was also accused of having used his alleged powers to threaten people who wronged him. 

He was put on trial in Åbo charged for having committed the murder of a man and adultery after having seduced a married woman by the use of witchcraft.  He was judged guilty and sentenced to decapitation. 

As one of the many famous cunning men of Finland, he was the subject of folk legend long after his death. He is the subject of a play, a poem and an opera.

References

1643 deaths
People executed for witchcraft
17th-century Finnish people
Cunning folk
17th-century executions
Witch trials in Finland
People executed by decapitation